Aleksei Yuryevich Bychkov (born 8 November 1972) is a former Russian professional footballer.

Club career
He made his professional debut in the Soviet Second League B in 1990 for PFC CSKA-2 Moscow.

Honours
 Russian Cup finalist: 1994, 2000.

European club competitions
 UEFA Intertoto Cup 1998 with FC Shinnik Yaroslavl: 1 game.
 UEFA Cup 2000–01 with PFC CSKA Moscow: 2 games.

References

1972 births
Footballers from Moscow
Living people
Soviet footballers
Association football forwards
Russian footballers
FC Shinnik Yaroslavl players
PFC CSKA Moscow players
Russian Premier League players
FC Fakel Voronezh players